Sisson Ridge is a settlement in New Brunswick  west of Plaster Rock. Adjacent communities include Crombie Settlement, Anfield, Weaver, North View and Linton Corner.

The current population of Sisson Ridge is estimated to be around 300.

History

Until the mid-1990s, it was the site of the Sisson Ridge Elementary School.

Notable people

Canadian Member of Parliament Wayne Marston was raised in Sisson Ridge prior to moving to Ontario in the 1960s.

See also
List of communities in New Brunswick

References

Settlements in New Brunswick
Communities in Victoria County, New Brunswick